The Catholic Committee against hunger and for development (CCFD-Terre Solidaire) is a French Catholic humanitarian aid non-governmental organization.

External links

Christian organizations based in France
Development charities based in France
Catholic charities